Aleksandr Vasilyevich Solop (born 23 June 1971) is a former Russian professional footballer.

Club career
He made his professional debut in the Soviet First League in 1991 for FC Kuban Krasnodar.

Honours
 Soviet Cup finalist: 1992.

References

Soviet footballers
Russian footballers
FC Kuban Krasnodar players
PFC CSKA Moscow players
Russian Premier League players
FC Fakel Voronezh players
FC KAMAZ Naberezhnye Chelny players
Hapoel Petah Tikva F.C. players
Hapoel Be'er Sheva F.C. players
Maccabi Netanya F.C. players
Russian expatriate footballers
Expatriate footballers in Israel
1971 births
Living people
FC Volgar Astrakhan players
FC Slavyansk Slavyansk-na-Kubani players
Association football defenders
FC Chernomorets Novorossiysk players